Valvata humeralis is a species of gastropod belonging to the family Valvatidae.

The species is found in North America. The species inhabits freshwater environments.

References

Valvatidae